The Gordon Schools is a six-year, non denominational comprehensive co-educational secondary school located in Huntly, Aberdeenshire, Scotland. It takes pupils from Gordon Primary School, Insch Primary School, and smaller primary schools located around that area of Aberdeenshire such as Drumblade, Glass, Gartly, Cairney, Clatt, Rhynie and Kennethmont.

The School was founded in 1839 by the Duchess of Gordon as a memorial to her late husband. The original buildings were designed by Archibald Simpson.

Notable former pupils
 John Andrew Crichton FRSE (1899-1985), nutritionist and agriculturalist
 Willie Donald (born 1953), cricketer and former president of Cricket Scotland
 Iona Fyfe (born 1998), award-winning Scots singer and musician.

Notable staff
 Ronald Center (1917-1973), music teacher from 1943 to 1949.
 Dr George Trapp FRSE FRGS (1906-1996), headmaster from 1948 to 1960.

References

External links

1904 picture of school

Secondary schools in Aberdeenshire
1839 establishments in Scotland
Educational institutions established in 1839
Huntly